Vitor Hugo Ferreira Oliveira (born 25 March 2003), known as Vitor Hugo, is a Brazilian professional footballer who plays for Palmeiras.

Club career 
Vitor Hugo made his professional debut for Palmeiras on the 6 December 2021, starting the Serie A game against Athletico Paranaense, and playing the full 90 minutes of this 0–0 away draw.

References

External links
Palmeiras official profile 

2003 births
Living people
Sportspeople from Minas Gerais
Brazilian footballers
Brazil youth international footballers
Association football forwards
Sociedade Esportiva Palmeiras players
Campeonato Brasileiro Série A players